Northern Ireland Civil Service is a football club which currently plays in 2B in the Northern Amateur Football League. The club is based at The Pavilion Stormont in Belfast. They Currently have 2 teams, the 1st playing in 2B and the 2nds playing in 3F. The club is connected to the Northern Ireland Civil Service. The club previously had intermediate status and played in the Irish Cup. It joined the Amateur League in 1951.

Honours

Intermediate honours
Clarence Cup: 1981–82

References

External links
NICSSA web site

Association football clubs in Northern Ireland
Association football clubs in Belfast
Northern Amateur Football League clubs
Financial services football teams in Northern Ireland